Bellona was a three-decker merchantman launched at Calcutta in 1796. In 1799 she sailed to Great Britain and was admitted to the Registry of Great Britain in 1800. A French frigate captured her in 1801.

Career
Bellona initially traded locally in Indian waters. She then sailed for Britain in 1789.

Bellona entered Lloyd's Register (LR) in 1800 with [George] Bowen, master, Lennox, owner, and trade London–India. She was admitted to the Registry of Great Britain on 10 January 1800. She then underwent fitting for the return voyage to India at a cost of £2736 8s 6d. Captain James Dunn sailed for Bengal on 4 December 1800.

Fate
The  captured Bellona on 16 June 1801
off the Cape of Good Hope. Bellona, Bowen, master was on her way from Calcutta to London. A prize crew under Ensign Jean-Michel Mahé took Bellona to Mauritius. Bellona arrived at Mauritius on 15 July.

Citations

References
 
 
 

1796 ships
British ships built in India
Age of Sail merchant ships of England
Captured ships